Senet is an ancient Egyptian board game.

Senet may also refer to:

People
 Senet (queen), ancient Egyptian queen
 Daniel Senet (born 1953), French weightlifter

Businesses
 Senet Inc., an American low-power wide-area network provider

See also
 Senat (disambiguation)
 Senate (disambiguation)